Slavětín is a market town in Louny District in the Ústí nad Labem Region of the Czech Republic. It has about 600 inhabitants.

Administrative parts
The village of Kystra is an administrative part of Slavětín.

Notable people
Konstantin Biebl (1898–1951), poet
Otto Trefný (1932–2019), physician and politician

References

Populated places in Louny District
Market towns in the Czech Republic